Ernst Karl Ferdinand von Prittwitz und Gaffron (20 January 1833 – 24 February 1904) was a Royal Prussian Lieutenant General and Knight of Justice of the Order of Saint John.

Family and private life
Von Prittwitz was born in Posen, Prussia (modern Poznań, Poland), he originated from the old noble house of von Prittwitz and was the son of Prussian General of the Infantry and Director of Fortifications Moritz Karl Ernst von Prittwitz and of Domicilie von Colbe. 

On 26 November 1885 he married Franziska Freiin von Türckheim zu Altdorf (b. 14 June 1855 in Karlsruhe; d. 8 May 1936 ibidem), daughter of Grand Ducal Badenese Chamberlain, envoy and land owner Hans Freiherr von Türckheim zu Altdorf, Lord of Altdorf and Orschweier (Lahr District, Baden), and of Fanny Freiin von Hardenberg (House of Ober-Wiederstedt).

Von Prittwitz was a Knight of Justice in the Order of Saint John (Bailiwick of Brandenburg). He died in Karlsruhe.

Military career
In 1851 von Prittwitz joined the Guard Artillery in Berlin, became Second Lieutenant in 1853 and First Lieutenant in 1861. In the Second Schleswig War against Denmark he was assigned to General Helmuth von Moltke the Elder, Chief of Staff of the Prussian Army. Here he participated in Wyk auf Föhr in the capture of Otto Christian Hammer and on 29 June 1864 took part in the crossing of the sound to the isle of Als.

Promoted to Captain with 32 years of age in 1865, he commanded a battery of Guard Artillery at Berlin since 1867.

At the onset of the Austro-Prussian War of 1866 he was commander of a mounted Guard battery and as such participated in the campaign in Bohemia. This battery was assigned to the newly formed Hanoverian Field Artillery Regiment No. 10. Prittwitz was thus deployed to Hanover in autumn 1866 but only after three quarters of a year he returned to Berlin.

After the war Prittwitz undertook a number of journeys abroad, including England, France, Spain and Italy, and in 1869 he went to Romania as counselor of Prince Frederick III of Hohenzollern with whom he travelled a part of the Orient.

In the Franco-Prussian War Prittwitz took part in the battles of Gravelotte, Sedan —here he was wounded by a grenade— and in the conquest of Montmédy. His battery was the first to reach the hill of St. Privat near Gravelotte and fiercely fought the French, which not only caused designated emperor Wilhem I, but also Napoleon III to congratulate.

He was promoted to Major in 1872, became Colonel in 1883 and was made commanding officer of the 7th field artillery brigade in 1886. A Major General since 1888, Prittwitz retired in 1890.

Honours
Prittwitz was made an honorary citizen of Wyk auf Föhr.

Orders and decorations

References

Bibliography
Almanach de Gotha, Adelige Häuser A Band. VI (in German), p 334, vol. 29 in total, C. A. Starke Verlag, Limburg (Lahn) 1962, .
Von Prittwitz, Robert: "Das v. Prittwitz'sche Adels-Geschlecht" (The noble House of von Prittwitz) (in German), p. 145f., Verlag Wilh. Gottl. Korn, Breslau 1870.

1833 births
1904 deaths
Military personnel from Poznań
Lieutenant generals of Prussia
People from the Grand Duchy of Posen
People from the Province of Silesia
Silesian nobility
Prussian military personnel of the Second Schleswig War
Prussian people of the Austro-Prussian War
German military personnel of the Franco-Prussian War
Recipients of the Iron Cross (1870), 1st class
Commanders of the Order of Franz Joseph
Commanders of the Order of Saints Maurice and Lazarus
Commanders of the Order of the Star of Romania
Recipients of the Order of the Medjidie, 4th class
Recipients of the Order of St. Anna, 2nd class
Recipients of the Order of Saint Stanislaus (Russian), 2nd class
Crosses of Military Merit